Lake Tuendae is an artificial pond at the Desert Studies Center in Zzyzx, California.  It is inhabited by mudhens as well as the endangered Mohave tui chub.

See also
List of lakes in California

References
 
 

Lakes of the Mojave Desert
Reservoirs in San Bernardino County, California
Reservoirs in California
Reservoirs in Southern California